The Museum of Russian Art (MoRA) is a museum in Jersey City, New Jersey dedicated to exhibiting Russian art, particularly Soviet Nonconformist Art. It was established in 1980 as CASE Museum of Contemporary Russian Art (the name including the abbreviation for the Committee for the Absorption of Soviet Emigres.) The museum's historic brownstone building in Paulus Hook underwent renovation and re-opened in 2010.

The museum's mission statement as written in its request for proposals reads:

See also
Bulldozer Exhibition
Exhibitions in Hudson County
Jersey City Museum
Mana Contemporary
Norton and Nancy Dodge Collection of Soviet Nonconformist Art

References

External links

Museum of Russian Art
Art museums and galleries in New Jersey
Museums in Hudson County, New Jersey
Museum of Russian Art
Art museums established in 1980
Museum of Russian Art
Museum of Russian Art
Museum of Russian Art